Nearly a Lady is a lost 1915 American comedy silent film directed by Hobart Bosworth and written by Elsie Janis. The film stars Elsie Janis, Frank Elliott, Owen Moore, Myrtle Stedman and Harry Ham. The film was released on August 12, 1915, by Paramount Pictures.

Plot

Cast 
Elsie Janis as Frederica Calhoun
Frank Elliott as Lord Cecil Grosvenor
Owen Moore as Jack Rawlins
Myrtle Stedman as Mrs. Reginald Brooks
Harry Ham as Jim Brooks
Roberta Hickman as Elaine

References

External links 
 
 

1915 films
1910s English-language films
Silent American comedy films
1915 comedy films
Paramount Pictures films
American black-and-white films
American silent feature films
Lost American films
1915 lost films
Lost comedy films
1910s American films